is a Japanese drama film directed by Naoto Kumazawa, based on Mahokaru Numata's novel of the same name. It stars Yuriko Yoshitaka, Kenichi Matsuyama and Tori Matsuzaka.

Plot

Cast
 Yuriko Yoshitaka as Misako
 Kenichi Matsuyama as Yōsuke
 Tori Matsuzaka as Ryōsuke
 Aimi Satsukawa as Mitsuko
 Nana Seino as Chie
 Kaya Kiyohara as young Misako
 Tae Kimura as Hosoya

Awards

References

External links
 

2017 films
Films based on Japanese novels
Aeon Entertainment films
2010s Japanese films